The Virginian Railway Passenger Station, also known as the Virginian Station is a former rail station listed on the National Register of Historic Places in the South Jefferson neighborhood of the independent city of Roanoke, Virginia, U.S.A. Located at the intersection of Jefferson Street SE (VA 116) and Williamson Road, the Virginian Station served as a passenger station for the Virginian Railway between 1910 and 1956. The station was the only station constructed with brick along the entire length of the Virginian's  network. It was severely damaged by fire on January 29, 2001.

History
Standing at the division point between the New River Division and the Norfolk Division of the Virginian Railway, construction commenced on the Virginian Station in September 1909 and was complete by early 1910.

Overshadowed by the larger Norfolk & Western Railway, this would serve passengers traveling between West Virginia and Norfolk through 1956 when passenger service was discontinued. By 1959, Virginian would merge with Norfolk & Western, and the former station would be leased out and subsequently operated as a feed and seed store.

By the late 1990s, the station was threatened with demolition to make way for an expansion of the Carilion bio-tech campus resulting in its placement on the Roanoke Valley Preservation Foundation's 2000 list of Most Endangered Sites. Operating as the Depot Country Store, on January 29, 2001, the former station suffered severe damage as a result of a fire. Despite the extensive damage, the station was cited for both its unique design and contribution to the railroad industry in Roanoke, and has been listed on the Virginia Landmarks Register since April 2003 and the National Register of Historic Places since June 2003.

After the heyday of train travel in the 1920s, by the 1940s the Roanoke station served four passenger trains daily, two east and two west-bound. Railroad passenger traffic nationwide declined after World War II as the traveling public turned to airlines and automobiles. Passenger service through Roanoke on the Virginian ended in 1956.

The Virginian was merged into the Norfolk and Western in 1959. The station tragically burned on January 29, 2001 and was substantially destroyed.

By early March 2001, Ken Miller, president of the Roanoke Chapter NRHS and Alison Blanton, president of the Roanoke Valley Preservation Foundation led their respective organizations to form an informal partnership to restore the Virginian Station which is on the National Register of Historic Landmarks. Under sponsorship of the City of Roanoke appropriations and grants were obtained through the office of then-Congressman Bob Goodlatte, VDOT and the EPA which, with more than 20% matching funds, enabled the restoration to proceed.

Phase I restoration was begun and completed in 2012. That involved removal of the substantial asbestos and lead contamination, stabilization of the building and replacement of the tile roof destroyed by the fire. The replacement tile came from the Ludowici Company in Ohio who had provided the original in 1910. It is in the same style and a similar color as the original.

Phase II was completed in 2016. It comprised completion of the interior including wiring and HVAC, parking, landscaping and the Virginian monuments. Chapter Historian Ken Miller determined the original paint scheme from historical documents and photos as well as paint chips from another now-demolished Virginian station. All window frames and some doors were removed before the restoration, stored in a trailer on premises, re-finished and reinstalled.

The terrazzo floor was damaged in the fire but was restored to a modern day beauty.

The plan had always been for the place to be self-sustaining, not simply another museum. In that light, the organization determined that leasing the larger of the two buildings, the passenger station immediately next to the bridge as most suitable place for commercial use was most desirable. The building was completed and dedicated on November 10, 2016.

The chapter’s mechanical department restored and installed the operating signal light outside. Chapter members also recovered the large “Virginian” tablet monument when the Virginian’s Narrows power plant was demolished some 45 years ago.

The display will be open on a one-weekend a month schedule once the pandemic is over and public spaces are back to usable. At the present, the main building is leased by Chanticleer Catering.

References

External links
Roanoke Chapter of the National Railway Historical Society official website

Railway stations on the National Register of Historic Places in Virginia
National Register of Historic Places in Roanoke, Virginia
Virginian Railway
Railway stations in the United States opened in 1910
Railway stations closed in 1956
Spanish Revival architecture in Virginia
Buildings and structures in Roanoke, Virginia
Individually listed contributing properties to historic districts on the National Register in Virginia